Hellbound is a South Korean dark fantasy streaming television series directed by Yeon Sang-ho, based on his own webtoon of the same name. An original Netflix release set in the then future year of 2022, supernatural beings suddenly appear out of nowhere to condemn people to Hell. The series stars Yoo Ah-in, Kim Hyun-joo, Park Jeong-min, Won Jin-ah and Yang Ik-june.

The pilot episode of Hellbound premiered at the 2021 Toronto International Film Festival in the "Primetime program of TV series" on September 9, 2021, and became the first Korean drama to make it to the festival. It was released on Netflix on November 19, 2021, and became the world's most-watched Netflix series the next day, surpassing Squid Game, released two months prior in Singapore. Critics were positive of the show, but also cognizant that it followed in the footsteps of Squid Game; nonetheless, they predicted it to be heavily discussed and to have a lasting impact.

Series overview

Premise
Hellbound takes place in 2022–27 in South Korea. An otherworldly face called an angel suddenly starts to materialize to deliver prophecies called decrees that condemn certain individuals to Hell at a specific future time, either seconds or years away. Three hulking supernatural monsters appear at almost the exact time to maul and incinerate the person's body in a sort of spectacular show of force called a demonstration. Two organizations in cahoots, the cult-like New Truth Society and the gang-like Arrowhead group, gain power by playing on people's fears.

Of the six episodes of the series, episodes 1–3 focus on a detective investigating the supernatural phenomena, the chairman of the New Truth religious order, and a principled attorney. Except for the attorney, the core characters change in episodes 4–6, which take place 5 years later and focus on a television producer and his wife who have to struggle with the fact that their newborn baby is bound for Hell.

Cast

Main
 Yoo Ah-in (season 1) and Kim Sung-cheol (season 2) as Jeong Jin-soo, a cult leader of the emerging New Truth Society
 Park Sang-hoon as young Jeong Jin-soo
 Kim Hyun-joo as Min Hye-jin, an attorney
 Park Jeong-min as Bae Young-jae, a production director for a broadcasting station (Season 1)
 Won Jin-ah as Song So-hyun, the wife of Bae Young-jae (Season 1)
 Yang Ik-june as Jin Kyeong-hoon, a detective

Supporting
 Kim Do-yoon as Lee Dong-wook, a live streamer and member of Arrowhead, a gang of violent youths
 Kim Shin-rok as Park Jeong-ja, a single mother subject to the first public demonstration
Lee Re as Jin Hee-jeong, the daughter of Jin Kyeong-hoon
 Ryu Kyung-soo as Yoo Ji, a priest of the New Truth cult
 Kim Mi-soo as Deacon Young-in of the New Truth
 Lee Dong-hee as Chairman Kim Jeong-chil
 Cha Si-won as Deacon Sacheong of the New Truth
 Im Hyeong-guk as Gong Hyeong-joon, a sociology professor and leader in the Sodo counter-organization
 Kim Hyun as Church member

 Yang Dong-geun as the leader of Sodo (Season 2)
 Lim Seong-jae as a member of Sodo (Season 2)

Special appearance 
 Jo Dong-in (Season 2)
 Moon Geun-young (Season 2)

Production
The concept began with an 11-minute-long animated short titled The Hell (지옥) written and drawn by Yeon Sang-ho in 2002 that was expanded (through the addition of a second part) into the 34-minute-long short titled The Hell: Two Kinds of Life (지옥: 두개의 삶) in 2003. This was followed by a webtoon version of the concept retitled Hellbound published between 2009 and 2011.

In April 2020, Netflix approved production of an original series based on the webtoon. Yeon signed on to direct the series.

Season 1
In late July, Yoo Ah-in, Park Jung-min, Kim Hyun-joo, Won Jin-ah, Yang Ik-june, Kim Shin-rok, Ryu Kyung-soo and Lee Re were confirmed to play various roles in the series.

The series was filmed at Cube Indoor Studio from August 2020 to January 2021. The old Chungnam Provincial Government Buildings in Sunhwa-dong, Jung-gu and the Hannam University Missionary Village in Daedeok-gu were outdoor locations for filming. On February 25, 2021, the director and the cast of the Hellbound introduced the TV series at a Netflix content roadshow.

Season 2
On September 24, 2022, Netflix confirmed a second season. On March 2, 2023, it was confirmed that Kim Sung-cheol would replace Yoo Ah-in following drug use charges. Kim Hyun-joo, Kim Shin-rok, Yang Ik-june, Lee Dong-hee and Lee Re will reprise their respective roles in Season 2. Yang Dong-geun, Lim Seong-jae, Jo Dong-in and Moon Geun-young will also appear to enrich the narrative.

Episodes

Release
The series had its world premiere at the 2021 Toronto International Film Festival, when the first three episodes were screened in 'Primetime' section on September 9, 2021, and became the first Korean drama to make it to the festival. The first three episodes were also screened at the 26th Busan International Film Festival in newly created 'On Screen' section on October 7, 2021 and at the 65th BFI London Film Festival in the "Thrill" section on October 15, 2021. It was released for streaming on Netflix on November 19, 2021.

Reception
The review aggregator website Rotten Tomatoes reported a 97% approval rating, based on 32 reviews with an average rating of 7.90/10. The site's critical consensus reads, "Summoned by the devilish imagination of writer-director Yeon Sang-ho, Hellbound leverages its terrifying concept to thoughtfully explore human fallibility."

Audience response
With 67.52 million viewing hours in the week ending November 28, 2021, Hellbound was in 2nd place in the Global Top 10 weekly list of the most-watched TV shows (non-English).

On release it recorded 43.48 million viewing hours in three days of release and rose to top spot in the "Netflix global TOP 10 TV (non-English) category" as per the Netflix TOP 10 website. It ranked first in the "TOP 10" in 12 countries, whereas it was listed in the "TOP 10" list in 59 countries worldwide. This is the fastest rate for a Korean series on Netflix.

It surpassed another Netflix-produced Korean drama, Squid Game, as the most popular show on Netflix on its initial release.

Critical response

Nick Allen of RogerEbert.com gave the series a positive review, praising how the show mixed grounded horror with thoughtful discussions about sin. He wrote: "The wrath monster trio might be absurd, but the madness within Hellbound is extremely believable." Kylie Northover writing for The Age gave 4 stars out of 5 and appreciating the narrative wrote, "...the narrative steadily evolves into a compelling mix of police procedural, violent horror and shrewd commentary around ideas of human flaws, mortality, sin, justice and the influence of media." Referring to The Leftovers, she felt that Hellbound shows sensibilities as "humanity's search for purpose in the face of the divine, but its exploration of the conflicting ways in which humanity might react to such a mass event feels like something to which we can all, in a small way, relate post-pandemic.

Ed Power of The Telegraph rated the series with 3 stars out of 5 and stated, "Hellbound unspools like a mix of Clive Barker, The Da Vinci Code and the iconic Japanese horror, Ring." Kim Seong-hyeon reviewing for YTN wrote the "performances of the actors that make the hell of reality that the director solidly created in this way more smoothly". Concluding, Kim stated, "Although the somewhat insufficient CG leaves a little disappointment, Hell is a work that leaves a deep impression enough to offset that. There seems to be no doubt that Hell will be the most talked about work this winter." Abhishek Srivastava of The Times of India graded the series with 4 stars out of 5 and appreciated the narrative and performance stating, "It works multiple surprises in its narratives and features excellent performances that accentuate the drama on contrasts amongst its characters". About plot, Srivastava said, "In a neat, riveting plot twist, the show jumps ahead a few years; bringing in a new layer of characters, scenarios and situations,... Concluding his review he said, "Hellbound is not a horror thriller, or a crime drama. [Rather] it combines elements from different genres to create a highly bingeable show where human behaviour comes under scrutiny." Jeffrey Zhang of Strange Harbors graded the series with B+ and stated, "Hellbound finds a tricky moral tightrope underneath its phantasmagoria - a meticulously crafted and surprisingly introspective chiller even when it stumbles in its thematic juggling act".

Squid Game comparison 
Stuart Heritage of The Guardian commenting on the comparison of the series with Squid Game wrote, "Hellbound is a truly exceptional drama wrapped in only the lightest of genre thrills. It might currently find itself swept up in Squid Game wake, but I guarantee that, of the two, it's the show that will still be talked about a decade from now."

Accolades

See also 
 Drag Me to Hell - a 2009 American film with a similar plot
 Inferno - a 2016 film with a similar theme
 Boogeyman
 Angels
 Demons
 Korean wave
 Christianity in Korea

References

External links
 
 
 
 Hellbound at Daum 
 
Hellbound on WEBTOON

2021 South Korean television series debuts
2020s horror television series
2020s mystery television series
2020s supernatural television series
South Korean fantasy television series
South Korean horror fiction television series
South Korean mystery television series
South Korean thriller television series
Dark fantasy television series
Horror drama television series
Religious drama television series
Television series about cults
Angels in television
Demons in television
Hell in popular culture
Korean-language Netflix original programming
Television shows based on South Korean webtoons